The 1949 All-Big Nine Conference football team consists of American football players selected to the All-Big Nine Conference teams selected by the Associated Press (AP), United Press (UP) and the International News Service (INS) for the 1949 Big Nine Conference football season.

All Big-Ten selections

Ends
Bud Grant, Minnesota (AP-1, UP-1)
Bob Wilson, Wisconsin (AP-1, UP-1)
Jack Dittmer, Iowa (AP-2)
Clifton Anderson, Indiana (AP-2)

Tackles
Leo Nomellini, Minnesota (AP-1, UP-1)
Alvin Wistert, Michigan (AP-1, UP-1)
Dick O'Hanlon, Ohio State (AP-2)
Lou Karras, Purdue (AP-2)

Guards
Lloyd Heneveld, Michigan (AP-1, UP-1)
Jack Lininger, Ohio State (AP-1)
Charles Gottfried, Illinois (AP-2, UP-1)
Robert Wahl, Michigan (AP-2)

Centers
Clayton Tonnemaker, Minnesota (AP-1, UP-1)
Joe Kelley, Wisconsin (AP-2)

Quarterbacks
Don Burson, Northwestern (AP-1, UP-1)
Pandel Savic, Ohio State (AP-2)

Halfbacks
Chuck Ortmann, Michigan (AP-1, UP-1)
Johnny Karras, Illinois (AP-1, UP-1)
Bill Bye, Minnesota (AP-2)
Bob Teague, Wisconsin (AP-2)

Fullbacks
Gerry Krall, Ohio State (AP-1)
Bob Momsen, Ohio State (UP-1)
John Kerestes, Purdue (AP-2)

Key
AP = Associated Press, chosen by conference coaches

UP = United Press

INS = International News Service

See also
1949 College Football All-America Team

References

All-Big Nine Conference
All-Big Ten Conference football teams